Eternal Best (also known as Best 8) is a compilation album of songs taken from BMG Japan releases of the Toshiko Akiyoshi – Lew Tabackin Big Band and the Toshiko Akiyoshi Jazz Orchestra featuring Lew Tabackin.

Track listing
All songs composed and arranged by Toshiko Akiyoshi:

 "Long Yellow Road"
 "First Night"
 "Road Time Shuffle"
 "Sumi-e"
 "Salted Gingko Nuts"
 "Pollination" (from the "Four Seasons of Morita Village" Suite)
 "China Remembered (My Teacher, Mr. Yan)"
 "Minamata Suite"
 "Peaceful Village"
 "Prosperity & Consequence"
 "Epilogue"

References
BMG Japan BVCJ-37009

External links
Toshiko Akiyoshi discography at Sonymusic.co.jp (Japan)
Best 8 at Tower.com

Toshiko Akiyoshi – Lew Tabackin Big Band albums
1998 greatest hits albums